Milivoj Krmar (born 1 April 1997) is a Serbian professional footballer who plays as an attacking midfielder.

Club career

Spartak Subotica
Krmar passed all Spartak Subotica youth selections. He signed scholarship contract with club in summer 2013. After the end of his youth career, Milivoj joined the first-team squad, signing a three-year professional contract with club in summer 2016. He made his debut in the 3rd fixture of the 2016–17 Serbian SuperLiga season, against Radnik Surdulica, replacing a captain Vladimir Torbica. In the next fixture, he scored a goal in defeat against Novi Pazar, during the match which he also started as a reserve player. Krmar also scored a goal in a Serbian Cup match against OFK Bačka, played on 20 September 2016. Krmar collected 19 appearances with 2 goals in both domestic competitions. After he started the new season as a back-up player, making an appearance in a match against Borac Čačak, Krmar moved on a half-season loan deal to Bačka 1901 in summer 2017. In February 2018, passing the winter-break with Spartak, Krmar extended a loan deal to Bačka 1901 until the end of season, making 23 appearances in the Serbian League Vojvodina and scoring 9 goals at total.

Hajduk Kula, Radnički Zrenjanin and Timočanin
On 18 January 2019, Hajduk Kula confirmed on their Facebook profile, that they had signed Krmar. In the summer 2019, he left Hajduk Kula and joined Radnički Zrenjanin. He later on played for Timočanin.

Krupa
On 22 July 2020, Krmar signed a three-year contract with Bosnian Premier League club Krupa. He made his official debut for the club in a league match against Borac Banja Luka on 31 August 2020. Krmar terminated his contract with the club on 19 December 2020.

Career statistics

Club

References

External links

1997 births
Living people
People from Čoka
Serbian footballers
Serbian expatriate footballers
Expatriate footballers in Bosnia and Herzegovina
Serbian SuperLiga players
Premier League of Bosnia and Herzegovina players
FK Spartak Subotica players
FK Bačka 1901 players
FK Hajduk Kula players
FK Timočanin players
FK Krupa players
Association football midfielders